Gary Richards may refer to:

 Gary Richards (footballer) (born 1963), former Welsh footballer
 Gary Richards (music executive) (born 1970), American music executive, concert promoter and DJ
 Gary Richards, American radio host and soccer commentator on Champions Soccer Radio Network

See also
 Gary Richard (born 1965), American football player
 Garry Richards (born 1986), English footballer